The 2002–03 Croatian Football Cup was the twelfth edition of Croatia's football knockout competition. Dinamo Zagreb were the defending champions, and the cup was won by Hajduk Split.

Calendar

Preliminary round

First round

Second round

Quarter-finals

|}

Semi-finals

First legs

Second legs

Hajduk Split won 2–0 on aggregate.

Uljanik Pula won 5–1 on aggregate.

Final

First leg

Second leg

Hajduk Split won 5–0 on aggregate.

See also
2002–03 Croatian First Football League
2002–03 Croatian Second Football League

External links
Official website 
2002–03 in Croatian football at Rec.Sport.Soccer Statistics Foundation

Croatian Football Cup seasons
Croatian Cup, 2002-03
Croatian Cup, 2002-03